Salvia grewiifolia is an undershrub that is native to Bolivia and Brazil, growing in open dry forest and clearings.

Notes

grewiifolia
Flora of Bolivia
Flora of Brazil